Borová Lada is a municipality and village in Prachatice District in the South Bohemian Region of the Czech Republic. It has about 300 inhabitants.

Administrative parts
Villages and hamlets of Černá Lada, Knížecí Pláně, Nový Svět, Paseka, Šindlov, Svinná Lada and Zahrádky are administrative parts of Borová Lada.

Geography
It lies in the Bohemian Forest and mostly in the Šumava National Park. The Teplá Vltava flows through the municipality. The territory is densely forested. There are moors in the northern part of the municipality.

History
Borová Lada was founded around 1750, It was founded on the initiative of the owner of this territory, Prince Adam Franz of Schwarzenberg. In 1855, the population comprised 230 people, and in 1930 384 people, most of them ethnic Germans. After the World War II they were expelled.

Gallery

References

External links

Villages in Prachatice District
Bohemian Forest